Criminal is a Chilean thrash/death metal band formed in late 1991 in Santiago by Anton Reisenegger (guitar and vocals) and Rodrigo Contreras (lead guitar). Later they were joined by J.J. Vallejo on drums and Juan Francisco Cueto as bassist, completing the original lineup. The band incorporates elements of thrash metal, death metal, groove metal and hardcore. They later moved to Colchester, England.

The band received international attention with their second studio album, Dead Soul, released in 1997. Their next release, Sicario, established them as a known band in Europe and received good reviews.

Criminal have released eight studio albums, two live albums, and two demos.

History 
In late 1991, Reisenegger Anton joined Rodrigo Contreras to start a new thrash metal band: Criminal. Anton was already known in the local underground scene, and had received recognition by bands like Napalm Death and Dismember. The latter band had played with Rodrigo Contreras before.

Their debut show was in April 1992, opening for Kreator. That same year they released two demos that got wide distribution in the local scene. Their second demo, Forked received good reviews by international heavy metal magazines like Metal Hammer in Holanda.

In 1994, they recorded their first album, Victimized, independently and sold 1000 copies in three weeks of its release. The album got the attention of the major BMG label. The album was distributed in countries like Mexico, Argentina and Japan. The videos of Self Destruction and Disorder were frequently broadcast on MTV Latin America on the Head Bangers show, rapidly gaining reputation  internationally. After that they made their first appearance outside their country, in Buenos Aires, Argentina and Montevideo. In 1995, they played at the Festival of Latin American Metal in Guadalajara, Mexico. After this show J.J. Vallejo was replaced by Jimmy Ponce, drummer of Slavery.

In 1996, the group opened shows for Bruce Dickinson and Motörhead, also releasing the EP Live Disorder.

In 1997, they released Dead Soul, which is held in high regard by fans and critics alike. The album was released in the United States and Europe. They collaborated with Exodus and Napalm Death for the release-show of the album.

In late 1998, they released the compilation album Live Slave Master which has both studio and live performances, and the demo songs from Forked.

In early 2000, Reisenegger and Contreras began producing the third album, Cancer. The album was heavily criticized by fans as they had a shift in their music style, the album being labeled as a commercial record and far from the aggressive style of their early albums. However, the album was well received in Europe.

The 2001, Reisenegger moved to England and met the lead singer of Extreme Noise Terror, which he would join as a guitarist for their tour the following year. It was here that here would get to know a member of that band, Zac O'Neil (drums), who would lead him to undertake other musical directions. Anton showed him Criminal material to convince the drummer to continue the project. Zac already had planned to form a band with bassist Robin Eaglestone (ex Cradle of Filth) and keyboardist Mark Royce (from Entwined). Both immediately accepted the Chilean's idea, meaning that Jimmy Ponce and Juan Francisco Cueto were no longer in the band.

Regarding the internationalization of the band and their settlement in England, Anton said the following in an interview in Chile:

With these new members he started a tour in Europe, one of the highlights was a performance at the Wacken Open Air festival in Germany. Due to internal problems, Anton Reisenegger and Robin Eaglestone suffered personal differences before "No Gods No Masters" was completed, Robin was ejected from the band.

No Gods No Masters was released in Europe on 23 February 2004 in Springvale Studios in Suffolk, United Kingdom. The name was inspired by one of the anarchist movements. The bass parts were improvised by the guitarists of the band. In subsequent tours they were rejoined by band's original bassist and founder: Juan Francisco Cueto. With this began a new tour, including a mini tour of Chile.

Soon the band began work on a new album which was released in 2005 under the name Minion. This was recorded at Stage One Studios in Borgentreich, Germany and was voted one of the ten best albums of 2005 by Terrorizer magazine. The sound of the album returned to the simplicity and power of their riffs. The graphic design on the album cover was provided by Claudio Bergamin, who had participated in the design of No Gods No Masters.

Despite the success of the tours Criminal again made a lineup change. Cueto decided to retire, giving way to Glover Staff who had played with the band on tour with Six Feet Under. Nevertheless, due to the abrupt departure of Glover it was Dan Biggin who played with the band on the final shows of the tour.

In 2006 and 2007, the band continued to promote the new album.

Criminal opened for Megadeth in their tour through Chile in 2008.

In early 2009, the band ventured on the acclaimed White Hell Tour where they were promoting their latest album called White Hell.

On 26 January 2010, the band opened for Metallica at the Santiago Equestrian Club.

Despite the stability that had the group among its members, during a European tour fans noticed the absence of a signature member of the quartet, Rodrigo Contreras. His replacement was Olmo Cascallar who hails from the Basque band Gamora. In respect, Anton Reisenegger issued the following statement on his website:

On the band's eighth album Fear Itself, Cascallar was replaced by Sergio Klein.

Discography

Demos 
 Demo (1992)
 Forked Demo (1992)

Albums 
 Victimized (1994)
 Dead Soul (1997)
 Cancer (2000)
 No Gods No Masters (2004)
 Sicario (2005)
 White Hell (2009)
 Akelarre (2011)
 Fear Itself (2016)
 Sacrificio (2021)

EPs 
 Live Disorder (1996)

Live albums 
 Slave Master Live (1998)

Band members

Current members 
 Anton Reisenegger – vocals, guitar
 Sergio Klein – lead guitar
 Danilo Estrella – drums
 Dan Biggin – bass

Former members 
 Rodrigo Contreras – guitar
 Juan Francisco "Cato" Cueto – bass
 J.J Vallejo – drums
 Jimmy Ponce – drums
 Robin Eaglestone – bass
 Staff Glover – bass
 Aldo Celle – bass
 Olmo Cascallar- guitar
 Zac O'Neil – drums

References

External links 
Official website

Musical groups established in 1991
Chilean thrash metal musical groups
Chilean death metal musical groups
English thrash metal musical groups
English death metal musical groups
Chilean heavy metal musical groups